Garcinia pseudoguttifera, known as the mo'onia tree in its native range, is a species of flowering tree in the family Clusiaceae or Guttiferae.

Distribution
Garcinia pseudoguttifera is native to Oceania and is found in Fiji, Tonga, Vanuatu, New Caledonia, and the Solomon Islands.

Description
The crown is slender and sometimes spreading. The trunk can measure at least  in diameter. It is a dioecious species and has evergreen leaves, which are round and slightly ovate in shape. The fruit of the tree is pink when immature and its arils are edible. The flower bud is green before it blossoms.

Chemistry
Four benzophenones have been isolated from Garcinia pseudoguttifera: 6-hydroxy-2,4-dimethoxy-3,5-bis(3-methyl-2-butenyl)benzophenone (myrtiaphenone-A); 2,2-dimethyl-8-benzoyl-7-hydroxy-5-methoxy-6-(3-methyl-2-butenyl)benzopyran (myrtiaphenone-B); 2,6-dihydroxy-4-methoxy-3,5-bis(3-methyl-2-butenyl)benzophenone (vismiaphenone-C); and a new benzophenone, 2,2-dimethyl-8-benzoyl-3,7-dihydroxy-5-methoxy-6-(3-methyl-2-butenyl)-3,4-dihydrobenzopyran (pseudoguttiaphenone-A). The major component of Garcinia pseudoguttifera is eupha-8,24-dien-3β-ol.

Uses
An extract from the leaves is sometimes used as a pain reliever, and an oil from the fruit is used as a perfume. The wood is sometimes used as timber. The fruit is occasionally eaten.

See also
Garcinia
List of Garcinia species

References

pseudoguttifera
Taxa named by Berthold Carl Seemann
Plants described in 1871
Flora of Fiji
Flora of Tonga
Flora of Vanuatu
Flora of Oceania
Fruits originating in Asia
Medicinal plants of Oceania
Fruit trees
Trees of the Pacific
Edible fruits